The 1903 Maryland gubernatorial election took place on November 3, 1903.

Incumbent Governor John Walter Smith did not seek re-election.

Democratic candidate Edwin Warfield defeated Republican candidate Stevenson A. Williams.

General election

Candidates
Edwin Warfield, Democratic, businessman and former surveyor of the Port of Baltimore
Stevenson A. Williams, Republican, former State Senator
Silas M. Crabill, Socialist
William Gisriel, Prohibition, businessman, Prohibition candidate for Maryland's 4th congressional district in 1900

Results

References

Gubernatorial
1903
Maryland